The 1934–35 season was Chelsea Football Club's twenty-sixth competitive season.

Table

References

External links
 1934–35 season at stamford-bridge.com

1934–35
English football clubs 1934–35 season